Wynberg is a southern suburb of the City of Cape Town in Western Cape, South Africa. It is situated between Plumstead and Kenilworth, and is a main transport hub for the Southern Suburbs of Cape Town.

History 
In the 1650s, Jan van Riebeeck's farm Boscheuvel, where he planted the Cape's first vineyards and was the first to produce wine in the Cape, was located in the greater Wynberg area close to the slopes of Table Mountain. In 1683 land along the Liesbeek River was granted to Herman Weeckens by Simon van der Stel.  The farm was named De Oude Wijnbergh (Old Wine Mountain).  The Cape's rough seas in the winter months led to a formal winter anchorage in 1743 where ships would dock at Simons' Baai (present day Simon's Town).  A wagon route linking Cape Town to Simon's Town went over the hill adjacent to De Oude Wjinbergh estate.

When the British took control of the Cape settlement on 16 Sept 1795 the small farming area of Wynberg developed rapidly into a garrison town, as the British settled a large number of troops in the area. A notable settler was Alexander Tennant who built a house still standing, named Sonnebloem. At Wynberg the Dutch had earlier made a show of resistance, but they were soon driven from their post by the British. Wynberg was a convenient halfway point between Table Bay and False Bay and this led to a hub of commercial activity. The authorities had allotted places where large teams of oxen could be unyoked and graze which made this possible. The village provided farmers with an alternative to the market in Cape Town.  As more farms were subdivided commercial and residential properties began to increase.

Diplomat Edmund Roberts passed through Wynberg in 1833. He described it as being "beautiful," and being "adorned with a great number of gentlemen's seats, and neat cottages, the avenues leading to them having well-trimmed hedges of myrtle and oak..." The famous astronomer John Herschel lived at Wynberg between 1834 and 1838, where he set up a telescope to study the southern hemisphere skies, and also did some botanical work on South African flowers together with his wife Margaret. In addition, it was in Wynberg that the young Charles Darwin met Herschel in 1836, a meeting which considerably influenced Darwin's later work.

Battswood School was established in 1891 by Martha Grey.  Martha was a local coloured woman, born at the time of the emancipation of slavery in 1838. The school was closed and the property sold by the Dutch Mission Church in 1997, it was officially re-opened in Ottery, Cape Town, a few kilometres from Wynberg by ex-President Mandela in 2001.

One of South Africa's first electric power plants was built in Wynberg on Electric Road in 1893.  Opened by the mayor of Wynberg, James Bisset, to provide power to a local tram system and public streetlights.

Merger into Cape Town 
The municipality of Wynberg was merged into the City of Cape Town following a local referendum on the issue on 11 June 1927.; a merger that was fueled by complaints from community members in outlying areas of the Wynberg municipality such as Diep River and Plumstead that their areas were being neglected and that much needed urban upgrades to roads, sanitation, and the provision of electricity were not being met. Additionally the municipality had accrued a large loan account of £650,000 (equivalent to £318,400,000 in 2020). At the time Wynberg was the largest municipality boarding Cape Town in terms of the number of registered voters in the area (4250) with only Claremont (3226) and Sea Point (3601) being comparable; the municipality included the modern day Cape Town neighborhoods of Plumstead, Diep River, Retreat, Heathfield, Tokai, Constantia, Princess Vlei, Grassy Park, Southfield, Wynberg, and parts of Kenilworth.

Geography 

Wynberg is bordered by Kenilworth to the north and Plumstead to the south east, Constantia is situated to its west. Wynberg railway station is on the main line from Cape Town to Simon's Town.  Main Road (which runs from Central Cape Town through to Simon's Town) runs through Wynberg, and the suburb can also be accessed from the M3 freeway which skirts the west of the Neighborhood close to the Wynberg Military Base.

Demographics
According to the 2011 census the neighborhood had a total of 14,472 residents with 69.6% speaking English as their first language.

The 2001 the census recorded 4,417 households and 12,821 people residing in the suburb.  The racial makeup of the suburb was 8.42% Black African, 49.82% Coloured, 11.93% Indian/Asian, 29.83% White and 0% from other races. In the suburb the population was spread out, with 24.67% under the age of 18, 29.94% from 18 to 34, 25.65% from 35 to 54, 8.74% from 55 to 64, and 11.00% who were 65 years of age or older. For every 100 females there were 85.44 males. 77.69% of the population spoke English, 15.34% Afrikaans, 4.45% isiXhosa, 1.59% another African language and 0.92% some other language as a first language.

The 1904 census recorded a total population for the greater Wynberg municipal area at 20,404 residents.

Arts and culture
The Maynardville Community Chest Carnival takes place annually, during the first half of the year.

Attractions and amenities
Maynardville Park and Open-air Theater
Wynberg Park
Dutch Reformed Church

Education 
Wynberg Boys' High School, on the hillside above the main village, is the second oldest school in South Africa, having been established in 1841. It is located on Hawthornden Estate alongside the former stately home of Prince Labia. The Junior School is housed in Victorian buildings in Cape Town designed by acclaimed architect Sir Herbert Baker.
There are two prominent all-girls schools in the area: Wynberg Girls' High School is located near the village, whilst the Springfield Convent School is a Catholic school situated close to Wynberg Boys' High School.

Sports
The Royal Cape Golf Club, South Africa's oldest club, had its beginning on 14 November 1885 when Lt Gen Sir Henry Torrens, Governor of the Cape Colony chaired a meeting at the Cape Town Castle "for the purpose of introducing the game of golf and starting a club for the same". It was on Waterloo Green at the Wynberg Military Camp that the club established its first home. The layout of the course is not known and it is certain that playing conditions at their best were rough and ready.

Military base
The military base was established in 1804 following the report of a commission appointed to find a suitable base for the 'Hottentot Corps'. The farm of Alexander Tennant, De Oude Wynberg, was selected. From 1804 the military took increasing interest in this strategic location. Tennant sold 78 morgen to the Cape government in March 1809; while the British Secretary at War acquired a further 54 morgen in June 1886. December 1921 saw the transfer of all the land, property and buildings to the government of the Union of South Africa.

A rock behind 2 Military Hospital bears an inscription recording the dates when the 59th Regiment (2nd East Lancashire) formed part of the Cape garrison: 1806, 1859–61, 1911–14.

The Officers' Mess was declared a Provincial Heritage Site.

Coat of arms
Wynberg was a municipality in its own right from 1886 to 1927.  The town council adopted a coat of arms, designed by councillor Stanley Ponder, on 17 June 1895.

The shield was quartered.  In the first quarter were three golden rings on a red background (the arms of Jan van Riebeeck).  In the second quarter was a black anchor on a golden background, representing the Cape Colony.  The third quarter was black, showing a white tent with a pennant flying (to represent the military garrison).  The fourth quarter depicted a golden vine and three fleurs de lis against a green background. The motto was Vivit crescat floreat vitis.

Variants of these arms were later adopted by Wynberg Boys' High School, the Wynberg Bowling Club, Wynberg Sports Club, Wynberg Club and South Peninsula Rugby Football Club.

See also
 List of heritage sites in Wynberg, Cape Town

References

 
Suburbs of Cape Town